If This Is It may refer to:
"If This Is It" (Huey Lewis and the News song), 1984
"If This Is It" (Newton Faulkner song), 2009
"If This Is It" (Degrassi:The Next Generation episode), television episode from 2008

See also
This Is It (disambiguation)